Dual Hawks is an album by Centro-Matic and South San Gabriel. It consists of 23 tracks.  Will Johnson is the principal songwriter for both bands.

Track listing 
Centro-matic / Dual Hawks
"The Rat Patrol and DJs"
"Two Seats Gold Reserved"
"Quality Strange"
"Remind Us Alive"
"Every Single Switch"
"I, The Kite"
"Strychnine, Breathless Ways"
"All Your Farewells"
"Counting The Scars"
"Twenty-Four"
"A Critical Display of Snakes"

South San Gabriel / Dual Hawks
"Emma Jane"
"Kept On The Sly"
"When The Angels Will Put Out Their Lights"
"Of Evil/For Evil"
"My Goodbyes"
"Senselessly"
"Corner Cross"
"Trust To Lose"
"The Arc And The Cusp"
"Alabama Crusade"
"Jornada Del Muerto #20"
"From This I Will Awake"

Personnel 
 Will Johnson - vocals, guitars
 Scott Danbom - vocals, keyboards, violin
 Mark Hedman - bass
 Matt Pence - drums

References

External links
Official site

Centro-Matic albums
2008 albums
Split albums